Ashford station may refer to:

Ashford railway station (Surrey)
Ashford International railway station, Kent
Ashford West railway station, Kent